The SANDstorm hash is a cryptographic hash function designed in 2008 by Mark Torgerson, Richard Schroeppel, Tim Draelos, Nathan Dautenhahn, Sean Malone, Andrea Walker, Michael Collins, and Hilarie Orman for the NIST SHA-3 competition.

The SANDstorm hash was accepted into the first round of the NIST hash function competition, but was not accepted into the second round.

Architecture 
The hash function has an explicit key schedule. It uses an 8-bit by 8-bit S-box. The hash function can be parallelized on a large range of platforms using multi-core processing.

Both SANDstorm-256 and SANDstorm-512 run more than twice as slowly as SHA-2 as measured by cpb.

As of 2009, no collision attack or preimage attack against SANDstorm is known which is better than the trivial birthday attack or long second preimage attack.

References

External links
 SANDstorm Algorithm Specification
 SANDStorm Submission Package

Cryptographic hash functions
NIST hash function competition